An ordinal date is a calendar date typically consisting of a year and a day of the year or ordinal day number (or simply ordinal day or day number), an ordinal number ranging between 1 and 366 (starting on January 1), though year may sometimes be omitted. The two numbers can be formatted as YYYY-DDD to comply with the ISO 8601 ordinal date format.

Nomenclature

Calculation

Computation of the ordinal day within a year is part of calculating the ordinal day throughout the years from a reference date, such as the Julian date. It is also part of calculating the day of the week, though for this purpose modulo 7 simplifications can be made.

In the following text, several algorithms for calculating the ordinal day  is presented.

Trivial methods 
The most trivial method of calculating the ordinal day involves counting up all days that have elapsed per the definition:

 Let O be 0.
 From , add the length of month  to O, taking care of leap year according to the calendar used.
 Add d to O.

Similarly trivial is the use of a lookup table, such as the one referenced.

Zeller-like 
The table of month lengths can be replaced following the method of encoding the month-length variation in Zeller's congruence.

The formula reflects the fact that any five consecutive months in the range March–January have a total length of 153 days, due to a fixed pattern 31–30–31–30–31 repeating itself twice. This is similar to encoding of the month offset (which would be the same sequence modulo 7) in Zeller's congruence. As  is 30.6, the sequence oscillates in the desired pattern with the desired period 5. 

To go from the March 1 based ordinal day to a January 1 based ordinal day:
 For  (March through December),  where  is a function returning 0 or 1 depending whether the input is a leap year.
 For January and February, two methods can be used:
 The less redundant method is to use , where 306 is the number of dates in March through December. This makes use of the fact that the formula correctly gives a month-length of 31 for January.

"Doomsday" properties:

For  and  we get

giving consecutive differences of 63 (9 weeks) for  3, 4, 5, and 6, i.e., between 4/4, 6/6, 8/8, 10/10, and 12/12.

For  and  we get

and with m and d interchanged

Table

Month–day

The number of the month and date is given by

Day 100 of a common year:

April 10.
Day 200 of a common year:

July 19.
Day 300 of a leap year:

November - 5 = October 26 (31 - 5).

See also
Julian day
Zeller's congruence
 ISO week date

References

Calendars
Ordinal numbers